Luca Tarigo was one of a dozen s built for the  (Royal Italian Navy) in the late 1920s. Completed in 1929, she served in World War II.

Design and description
Their complement during wartime was 222–225 officers and enlisted men.

The Navigatoris were powered by two Parsons geared steam turbines, each driving one propeller shaft using steam supplied by four Odero-Terni-Orlando water-tube boilers.

Their main battery consisted of six  guns in three twin-gun turrets, one each fore and aft of the superstructure and the third amidships. Anti-aircraft (AA) defense for the Navigatori-class ships was provided by a pair of  AA guns in single mounts abreast the forward funnel and a pair of twin-gun mounts for  machine guns. They were equipped with six  torpedo tubes in two triple mounts amidships. The Navigatoris could carry 86–104 mines.

Construction and career
Luca Tarigo was laid down by Gio. Ansaldo & C. at their Genoa-Sestri Ponente shipyard on 30 August 1927, launched on 9 December 1928 and commissioned on 16 November 1929.

Citations

Bibliography

External links
 Luca Tarico Marina Militare website

Navigatori-class destroyers
Ships built in Genoa
1928 ships
World War II destroyers of Italy
Maritime incidents in April 1941
Ships built by Gio. Ansaldo & C.